The Temporary Provisions Effective During the Period of National Mobilization for Suppression of the Communist Rebellion were provisions of the Constitution of the Republic of China effective from 1948 to 1991 and amended four times by the Central Government of China. They effectively nullified the constitution and established martial law in Taiwan, where civil and political freedoms were curtailed. The official rationale for the provisions was the ongoing Chinese Civil War, but with the demise of the Kuomintang single-party system, the provisions were repealed.

History
The current Constitution of the Republic of China was adopted by the National Assembly in 1947, when the Nationalist Government was based in Nanjing. Since 1945, China was engulfed in a civil war that pitted the Nationalist Government against the Chinese Communist Party (CCP). In March 1948, the first National Assembly met in Nanjing, and after some deliberation, decided to invoke Article 174 of the Constitution to amend the Constitution". On 10 May 1948, the Assembly adopted the first set of Temporary Provisions that was set to expire after three years. In 1949, the Communists expelled the Nationalist Government from mainland China, and proclaimed the establishment of the People's Republic of China while Chiang's government retreated to Taipei, Taiwan, an island formerly a Japanese colony that was placed under ROC control after the surrender of Japan in 1945. In 1954, the National Assembly indefinitely renewed the Temporary Provisions in view of the Kuomintang's plans to recapture the mainland. The Temporary Provisions from then on were amended in accordance with the needs of the President of the Republic of China, Chiang Kai-shek, or his son Chiang Ching Kuo. In 1966, the Temporary Provisions were revised to allow for supplementary elections to the National Assembly from the Taiwan Area. In 1971, the ROC was expelled from the United Nations and replaced with representatives from the People's Republic of China; the Temporary Provisions were amended again in 1972. However, in 1979, the United States severed diplomatic relations with the ROC and recognized the PRC.

Abolition
It became clear that retaking the mainland was not a real possibility. On 22 April 1991, the National Assembly resolved to abolish the Temporary Provisions, and on April 30 of the same year, President Lee Teng-hui declared the end of the Mobilization for Suppression of Communist Rebellion as of May 1. The repeal of the provisions caused some ambiguity in cross-strait relations and the political status of Taiwan, raising questions such as whether the "Communist rebellion" has "succeeded" and so the PRC government is recognized as legitimate by the ROC, or whether it would be legal now for the CPC to operate in Taiwan.

Provisions
The Temporary Provisions allowed for the creation of the Taiwan Garrison Command and the National Security Council, both for the purpose of enforcing martial law. The provisions also allowed the President and Vice President of the Republic of China to be exempted from the two-term office limit. Extensive powers given to the president by the Temporary Provisions turned the ROC into a de facto presidential system, where the President also held the post of chairman of the Kuomintang, although the Constitution originally laid out a parliamentary system. Specifically, the provision relating to the president said:
In this Period of Communist Rebellion, for the sake of avoiding the emergent political crisis, and addressing the mammoth economic change, the president is empowered to adopt emergency measures through a resolution of a cabinet meeting of the Executive Yuan. The president's power will not be limited by the regular procedures of Articles 39 and 43 of the constitution.

See also
 Elections in the Republic of China
 History of the Republic of China
 Human rights in the Republic of China
 Transitional Justice Commission
 Period of mobilization for the suppression of Communist rebellion
 Politics of the Republic of China
 Republic of China Army
 History of Taiwan since 1945
 Tangwai movement
 List of political leaders who suspended the constitution

References

External links

History of Constitutional Revisions in the Republic of China
 Full text of the "Temporary Provisions Effective During the Period of Communist Rebellion"

1948 in law
Law of Taiwan
White Terror (Taiwan)
Taiwan under Republic of China rule
Constitution of the Republic of China